Loxophlebia austeria is a moth of the subfamily Arctiinae. It was described by Max Wilhelm Karl Draudt in 1915. It is found in Brazil.

References

 

Loxophlebia
Moths described in 1915